Hot Country Songs and Country Airplay are charts that rank the top-performing country music songs in the United States, published by Billboard magazine. Hot Country Songs ranks songs based on digital downloads, streaming, and airplay not only from country stations but from stations of all formats, a methodology introduced in 2012. Country Airplay, which was first published in 2012, is based solely on country radio airplay, a methodology that had previously been used from 1990 to 2012 for Hot Country Songs.

In the issue dated January 7, 2023, "You Proof" by Morgan Wallen was at number one on Country Airplay, the song's tenth week in the top spot, extending a record set the previous week for the longest-running number-one single based strictly off country radio rotation. Zach Bryan's "Something in the Orange" was the year's first number one on Hot Country Songs; topping the chart in its 36th week on the listing, it gave the singer his first number-one country single.  A week later, Jelly Roll achieved the same feat when he topped the Country Airplay chart with "Son of a Sinner", and Nate Smith did the same in February with "Whiskey on You". Later in February, Katelyn Brown achieved her first number one as a featured artist on her husband Kane Brown's "Thank God".  The track was only the second duet by a married couple to top a chart based on country radio airplay, following Tim McGraw and Faith Hill's "It's Your Love" in 1997.

Chart history

See also
2023 in country music
List of artists who reached number one on the U.S. country chart
List of Top Country Albums number ones of 2023

References

External links
Current Hot Country chart
Current Country Airplay chart

2023
Number-one country singles
United States Country Singles